Mohammad Ali (born 12 August 1989) is a Pakistani first-class cricketer who plays for Water and Power Development Authority.

References

External links
 

1989 births
Living people
Pakistani cricketers
Sialkot cricketers
State Bank of Pakistan cricketers
Sialkot Stallions cricketers
Water and Power Development Authority cricketers
Cricketers from Sialkot
Pakistan Television cricketers